Decibels relative to full scale (dBFS or dB FS) is a unit of measurement for amplitude levels in digital systems, such as pulse-code modulation (PCM), which have a defined maximum peak level. The unit is similar to the units dBov  and decibels relative to overload (dBO).

The level of 0dBFS is assigned to the maximum possible digital level. For example, a signal that reaches 50% of the maximum level has a level of −6dBFS, which is 6dB below full scale. Conventions differ for root mean square (RMS) measurements, but all peak measurements smaller than the maximum are negative levels.

A digital signal that does not contain any samples at 0dBFS can still clip when converted to analog form due to the signal reconstruction process interpolating between samples. This can be prevented by careful digital-to-analog converter circuit design. Measurements of the true inter-sample peak levels are notated as dBTP or dB TP ("decibels true peak").

RMS levels 
Since a peak measurement is not useful for qualifying the noise performance of a system, or measuring the loudness of an audio recording, for instance, RMS measurements are often used instead.

A potential for ambiguity exists when assigning a level on the dBFS scale to a waveform rather than to a specific amplitude, because some engineers follow the mathematical definition of RMS, which for sinusoidal signals is −3dB below the peak value, while others choose the reference level so that RMS and peak measurements of a sine wave produce the same result.

The unit dB FS or dBFS is defined in AES Standard AES17-1998, IEC 61606, and ITU-T Recs. P.381 and P.382, such that the RMS value of a full-scale sine wave is designated 0dB FS.  This means a full-scale square wave would have an RMS value of +3dB FS.  This convention is used in Wolfson and Cirrus Logic digital microphone specs, etc.

The unit dBov is defined in the ITU-T G.100.1 telephony standard such that the RMS value of a full-scale square wave is designated 0dBov.  All possible dBov measurements are negative numbers, and a sine wave cannot exist at a larger RMS value than −3 dBov without clipping. This unit can be applied to both analog and digital systems.  This convention is the basis for the ITU's LUFS loudness unit, and is also used in Sound Forge and Euphonix meters, and Analog Devices digital microphone specs (though referred to as "dBFS").

Dynamic range 
The measured dynamic range (DR) of a digital system is the ratio of the full scale signal level to the RMS noise floor. The theoretical minimum noise floor is caused by quantization noise. This is usually modeled as a uniform random fluctuation between − LSB and + LSB. (Only certain signals produce uniform random fluctuations, so this model is typically, but not always, accurate.)

As the dynamic range is measured relative to the RMS level of a full scale sine wave, the dynamic range and the level of this quantization noise in dBFS can both be estimated with the same formula (though with reversed sign):

The value of n equals the resolution of the system in bits or the resolution of the system minus 1bit (the measure error).  For example, a 16-bit system has a theoretical minimum noise floor of −98.09dBFS relative to a full-scale sine wave:

In any real converter, dither is added to the signal before sampling. This removes the effects of non-uniform quantization error, but increases the minimum noise floor.

History
The phrase "dB below full scale" has appeared in print since the 1950s, and the term "dBFS" has been used since 1977.

Although the decibel (dB) is permitted for use alongside units of the International System of Units (SI), the dBFS is not.

Analog levels 
dBFS is not defined for analog levels, according to standard AES-6id-2006. No single standard converts between digital and analog levels, mostly due to the differing capabilities of different equipment. The amount of oversampling also affects the conversion with values that are too low having significant error.   The conversion level is chosen as the best compromise for the typical headroom and signal-to-noise levels of the equipment in question. Examples:

 EBU R68 is used in most European countries, specifying +18dBu at 0dBFS.
 In Europe, the EBU recommend that −18dBFS equates to the alignment level.
 UK broadcasters, alignment level is taken as 0dBu (PPM4 or −4VU)
 The American SMPTE standard defines −20dBFS as the alignment level.
 US installations use +24dBu for 0dBFS.
 American and Australian Post: −20dBFS = 0VU = +4dBu.
 In Japan, France, and some other countries, converters may be calibrated for +22dBu at 0dBFS.
 BBC specification: −18dBFS = PPM"4" = 0dBu
 German ARD and studio, PPM+6dBu = −10 (−9)dBFS. +16 (+15)dBu = 0dBFS. No VU.
 Belgium VRT: 0 dB (VRT ref.) = +6dBu; −9dBFS = 0 dB (VRT ref.); 0dBFS = +15dBu.

See also 
Audio bit depth
Bit rate
Full scale

References

External links 
AES Pro Audio Reference definition of dBFS
dBFS – Sweetwater glossary

Digital audio
Logarithmic scales of measurement

ru:DBFS